Lowes is an unincorporated community and census-designated place (CDP) in Graves County, Kentucky, United States. As of the 2010 Census the population of Lowes was 98.

Demographics

Notable people
Alben W. Barkley, U.S. Senator and Vice President of the United States, born near Lowes
J. Paul Hogan, pioneer in the invention of the plastics industry, born in Lowes

References

Census-designated places in Graves County, Kentucky
Census-designated places in Kentucky